Bal-Sagoth (/baʊl 'sægɑθ/ b-owl SA-goth) were a symphonic black metal band from Sheffield, Yorkshire, England, formed in 1993.

Originally formed as an epic symphonic black metal band with strong death metal elements, vocalist/lyricist Byron Roberts took the name 'Bal-Sagoth' from the Robert E. Howard short story "The Gods of Bal-Sagoth". Their first demo was recorded in 1993, and Bal-Sagoth have since released three albums on Cacophonous Records, and three with Nuclear Blast.

History

Early days (1989–1993)
Bal-Sagoth was conceived in 1989 by Byron Roberts, in an attempt to form what he called "a sublimely symphonic black/death metal band swathed in a concept of dark fantasy and science fiction, inspired by the celebrated style of the grand pulp horror and fantasy literature of the 1930s". Inspired by such writers and artists as Robert E. Howard, H. P. Lovecraft, Clark Ashton Smith, Edgar Rice Burroughs, J.R.R Tolkien and Jack Kirby, Byron set out to create his own dark fantasy universe, with tales told through epic lyrics and music. After several unsuccessful attempts to launch the project, Byron was introduced to the brothers Chris and Jonny Maudling in 1993, who were also looking to form a serious band. This formed what would become the writing core of the outfit. After several months of rehearsing, and following a line up reshuffle which saw the departure of lead guitarist Alistair MacLatchy, the band recorded their first demo in late 1993. The band roster at this point consisted of Byron Roberts on vocals, Chris Maudling on guitar, Jonny Maudling on drums, Jason Porter on bass and Vincent Crabtree on keyboards. The demo attracted the attention of Cacophonous Records, who signed the band to a three-album deal.

First Trilogy (1994–1999)

The band entered Academy Music Studio in June 1994 and recorded their debut album, A Black Moon Broods Over Lemuria, in just two weeks. Due to label problems, the album was shelved for nearly a year, finally seeing the light of day in 1995. The album showcased more traditional black metal/death metal ideas versus the more epic and sprawling arrangements the group would utilize in later works. The vocal style of Byron Roberts is also different from later efforts, using more traditional death metal and black metal grunts, as well as the spoken narrative passages which would become more prevalent on subsequent albums.

In 1996, Bal-Sagoth released Starfire Burning Upon the Ice-Veiled Throne of Ultima Thule, again recorded at Academy Music Studio in England. The album marked a key shift in the band's sound, now focusing more on the composition and arrangement skills of drummer (and studio keyboard player) Jonny Maudling, as well as the "storytelling" aspect of Byron Roberts's spoken-word vocals. Through keyboards, the band incorporated a virtual symphony orchestra as an equal fifth instrument, along with guitar, bass, drums and vocals. This new sound would be expanded and explored on all four of the band's later efforts.

Joined by touring keyboardist Leon Forrest and bassist Alistair MacLatchy, who had in fact been an original member of the band in its very earliest incarnation, Bal-Sagoth teamed up with Dark Funeral and Ancient in March 1997 for the "Starfire Engulfs Europe Tour" (AKA the "Satanic War Tour II"), a 23-date trek through Europe, followed by the second leg in October 1997 with the black metal band Emperor and thrash metal outfit Nocturnal Breed.

Bal-Sagoth spent much of 1997 writing and recording what would become the album Battle Magic.  Again recorded at Academy Music Studio in England, this time the band were afforded nearly a full month to record the album. Released in March 1998, Battle Magic caught the attention of Nuclear Blast records, who subsequently signed Bal-Sagoth to a three-album deal with worldwide distribution (a first for the band).

Rather than tour in support of Battle Magic, the band opted to immediately focus on the writing and recording of their Nuclear Blast debut.  Frustrated with fill-in tour keyboard players, Jonny Maudling decided to focus full-time on composition and live keyboards in 1999, handing drum duties over to Dave Mackintosh (later of DragonForce).

Second Trilogy (1999–2006)

In 1999, Bal-Sagoth released their first album with Nuclear Blast, The Power Cosmic. Focusing on an intergalactic tale of war, cosmic empires, and celestial gods, the album pushed the band to new heights both artistically, and in popularity. After the release of The Power Cosmic, the band again disappeared, playing no shows until the release of 2001's Atlantis Ascendant.

The band resurfaced as a live act in 2001, embarking on "The Fifth Cataclysm Devours Europe: Phase 1" tour (AKA: No Mercy festival tour) with Mortician, Sinister, Vader, Amon Amarth, Marduk, God Dethroned, ...and Oceans, and Mystic Circle. Shortly after this, they embarked upon another European tour with Marduk. Later in 2002, the band played the Bloodstock Open Air indoor festival, which was followed by a short tour with Return to the Sabbat in the United Kingdom. In 2004, Dave Mackintosh left the band and joined DragonForce. He was replaced by Dan Mullins (who left the band in 2006 and later became drummer of My Dying Bride), who made his debut with Bal-Sagoth at Wacken Open Air 2004.

In March 2006, Bal-Sagoth released their long-awaited sixth album, The Chthonic Chronicles on Nuclear Blast records.  The music was recorded entirely at Jonny Maudling's Waylands Forge Studio, while the vocals of Byron Roberts were recorded once again at the famed Academy Music Studio. Shortly after its release the band recruited a new drummer, Paul Jackson. The album was the band's first in five years, and is rumoured to be their last, although the band have stated that they have no concrete intentions of either recording another album or splitting up, and that various members of the band may soon be announcing side projects.

Recent activity (2006–present)
In the summer of 2006, Bal-Sagoth played at the Bloodstock Open Air festival, and in January 2007 they made their first trip to the US to headline the "Heathen Crusade II" festival in St. Paul, Minnesota. In January 2008, they journeyed to Finland to headline shows in Helsinki and Turku, supported by Finnish band Battlelore, and in November 2008 they played the Screamfest festival in Oslo, Norway. In May 2009, the band played two shows in Lisbon and Porto, Portugal. In January 2010, Mark Greenwell left the band to be replaced by previous bassist Alistair MacLatchy, and in March 2010, Bal-Sagoth returned to Finland to play a show in Helsinki with fellow English band Skyclad. On 14 August 2010, Bal-Sagoth performed at the Brutal Assault festival in the Czech Republic. On 5 March 2011, the band played a headlining show in Bern, Switzerland.

In November 2011, three of the band's albums (The Power Cosmic, Atlantis Ascendant and The Chthonic Chronicles) were reissued as limited edition digipaks by Nuclear Blast's affiliate label Metal Mind Productions. The reissues featured expanded lyric booklets, additional artwork and remastered audio. The band also announced on their Facebook page that they are planning a limited edition re-release of their demo, previously only available in very limited numbers via cassette tape. In March 2013 it was announced that the 1993 demo release would be entitled "Apocryphal Tales" and would be available as a "20th anniversary" limited edition 12-inch vinyl LP, issued through the independent label Sacrilege Records.
In September 2013 Bal-Sagoth announced that the release had been changed to limited edition 10" vinyl and CD, now issued by the UK labels Godreah Records and Exhumation Records.

In February 2013 it was announced that Bal-Sagoth guitarist Chris Maudling and keyboardist Jonny Maudling had formed a new band called "Kull", composed of various members of Bal-Sagoth and unsigned death metal band Dyscaphia.

On 21 February 2015 the fantasy anthology paperback "Swords of Steel" was published by DMR Books. The publication contains a short story by Bal-Sagoth vocalist/lyricist Byron Roberts entitled "Into the Dawn of Storms" which features characters from the Bal-Sagoth lyrical canon.

On 30 July 2015, the fantasy anthology "Barbarian Crowns" was published by Horrified Press/Barbwire Butterfly Books. This publication contains a short story by Byron Roberts entitled "Chronicles of the Obsidian Crown" which features characters and events from the Bal-Sagoth lyrical canon.

On the same day, the fantasy anthology "Devil's Armory" was also published by Horrified Press. This publication contains a short story by Byron Roberts entitled "Darkfall: Return of the Vampyre Hunter" which features characters from the Bal-Sagoth lyrics.
In addition, the publication of "Barbarian Crowns" was accompanied by the release of a compilation CD entitled "Bloodmist at Dawn" issued through the US based label Majestic Metal Records, which featured two Bal-Sagoth tracks.

On 27 February 2016, the fantasy anthology paperback "Swords of Steel II" was published by DMR Books. This publication contains a short story by Byron Roberts entitled "A Voyage on Benighted Seas", the second installment of a trilogy which began in the first volume of "Swords of Steel" featuring characters from the Bal-Sagoth lyrical canon.

On 13 May 2016, the band's first two albums A Black Moon Broods Over Lemuria and Starfire Burning Upon the Ice-Veiled Throne of Ultima Thule were re-released by Cacophonous Records as special edition CDs. The re-issues feature remastered audio, expanded lyric booklets, new sleeve notes and exclusive new artwork. On 16 September 2016, the third Bal-Sagoth album Battle Magic was reissued by Cacophonous Records on CD featuring remastered audio, expanded lyric booklet and new cover artwork.

On 19 May 2017, the fantasy anthology paperback "Swords of Steel III" was published by DMR Books. This publication contains a short story by Byron Roberts entitled "The Scion at the Gate of Eternity", the third installment of a trilogy featuring characters from the Bal-Sagoth lyrical canon.

On 18 March 2018 the sword and sorcery anthology "Dreams of Fire and Steel" was published by Nocturnicorn Books. The book includes a short story by Byron Roberts titled "Caylen-Tor", featuring the character which first appeared in the lyrics of the second Bal-Sagoth album Starfire Burning Upon the Ice-Veiled Throne of Ultima Thule in 1996.

On 14 May 2019 the novel "The Chronicles of Caylen-Tor" was published by DMR Books. The book consists of three novellas by Byron Roberts featuring the character Caylen-Tor who first appeared in the lyrics of the second Bal-Sagoth album Starfire Burning Upon the Ice-Veiled Throne of Ultima Thule in 1996.

On 24 May 2019, the debut album of Jonny and Chris Maudling's new musical project "Kull" was released by the Swedish independent label Black Lion Records.

On 16 October 2020, The Power Cosmic, Atlantis Ascendant and The Chthonic Chronicles were reissued as digipak CD editions via Dissonance Productions.

On 13 May 2021, the novel "The Chronicles of Caylen-Tor Volume II" was published by DMR Books. The book consists of four stories by Byron Roberts featuring his character Caylen-Tor who first appeared in the lyrics of the second Bal-Sagoth album Starfire Burning Upon the Ice-Veiled Throne of Ultima Thule and is a sequel to "The Chronicles of Caylen-Tor".

In October 2020, February 2021 and July 2021, limited vinyl editions of the fourth, fifth and sixth Bal-Sagoth albums were released by the Italian specialist vinyl label Night of the Vinyl Dead. The releases featured coloured vinyl and special packaging, with "The Power Cosmic" including a movable die-cut tab, "Atlantis Ascendant" sporting a lenticular 3D cover, and "The Chthonic Chronicles" featuring a gatefold sleeve secured by a die-cut magnetic clasp.

In 2022, "The Power Cosmic", "Atlantis Ascendant" and "The Chthonic Chronicles" were reissued as gatefold "splatter vinyl" LPs by the specialist vinyl label "Back On Black".

Members

Current members 
 Byron Roberts – vocals (1993–present)
 Jonny Maudling – drums (1993–1998), keyboards (1998–present)
 Chris Maudling – bass (1993–1998), guitar (1993–present)
 Paul Jackson – drums (2007–present)
 Alistair MacLatchy – bass (2010–present)

Former members 
 Vincent Crabtree – keyboards (1993–1995)
 Dave Mackintosh – drums (1998–2004)
 Dan Mullins − drums (2004–2006)
 Mark Greenwell – bass (1998–2010)

Touring members 
 Jason Porter – bass guitar (1993–1996)
 Leon Forrest – keyboards (1995–1998)
 Alistair MacLatchy – bass (1996–1998)

Timeline

Discography

References

External links 
 Official Bal-Sagoth website – Official site containing much information on the band.
 Official Bal-Sagoth MySpace page – Features news updates, FAQ's, photos, etc.
 Byron Roberts Official Site – Official band news, features on lyrics, blogs, etc.
 Wayland's Forge Official Site – Information on Waylands Forge recording studio
 Official Band Blog – Official Bal-Sagoth News Site and Blog
 Finnish Unofficial Bal-Sagoth Website – Contains information in Finnish, most of which is simply translated from the official site.

English black metal musical groups
Symphonic black metal musical groups
Musical groups established in 1993
Musical quintets
1993 establishments in England